The 2012–13 Boise State Broncos men's basketball team represented Boise State University during the 2012–13 NCAA Division I men's basketball season. The Broncos, led by third year head coach Leon Rice, played their home games at Taco Bell Arena and were a member of the Mountain West Conference. They finished the season 21–11, 9–7 in Mountain West play to finish in a tie for fourth place. They lost in the quarterfinals of the Mountain West tournament to San Diego State. They received an at-large bid to the NCAA tournament, the school's first ever at-large bid, where they lost in the First Four round to La Salle.

Roster

Schedule
On August 10, the Mountain West announced the conference schedule and Boise State also announced a few confirmed non conference games. The full schedule was released on August 17.

|-
!colspan=9| Exhibition

|-
!colspan=9| Regular season

|-
!colspan=9| 2013 Mountain West tournament

|-
!colspan=9| 2013 NCAA tournament

Season notes
Boise State's win over #11 Creighton on November 28 is the highest ranked team Boise State has ever beaten in program history. The previous highest ranked team they defeated was #15 Washington in 1998. Following the win over Creighton, the Broncos began to receive votes in both the AP and Coaches polls. Their win over LSU on December 14 was Boise State's first win ever against a team from the SEC. On December 30, Jr. Jeff Elorriaga set a Boise State and Mountain West record by making 10 3-pointers in a win against Corban. With 30 points against Corban, Elorriaga became the third Bronco this season to score 30 or more points (Marks 35 vs Creighton, Drmic 34 vs LSU). It is the first time in school history that three different Broncos have scored 30 points in a game during the same season. The 67-point win over Walla Walla on January 5 was the largest margin of victory in school history. The Broncos set a school record with 12 non-conference wins. On January 9, leading scorer Derrick Marks along with Mikey Thompson, Kenny Buckner and Darrious Hamilton were suspended for violation of team rules for the Mountain West opener vs Wyoming. The Broncos only played 7 players and won the game by 2. On January 23 vs Fresno State, the Broncos went 26 for 26 at the line to set a new school and Mountain West record for most made free throws without a miss. The previous conference record was 23 for 23 set by Colorado State in 2011–12. Derrick Marks and Anthony Drmic were named to the Mountain All-Conference 2nd team. Their berth in the NCAA Tournament is the school's sixth overall appearance, first since 2008, and first at-large berth ever.

Team statistics 
Final season stats.
Retrieved from Broncosports.com

Gallery

References

Boise State Broncos men's basketball seasons
Boise State
Boise State
Boise State Broncos men's bask
Boise State Broncos men's bask